Florence Schechter is the founder and director of the Vagina Museum. She is also a science communicator, comedian and public speaker. Her debut book, "V: An Empowering Celebration of the Vulva and Vagina", is being published by Penguin Random House in March 2023.

Early life and education 
Schechter graduated from the University of Birmingham in 2014 with a BSc in Biochemistry.

Vagina Museum 
In 2017, Schechter founded the Vagina Museum after discovering that there was a penis museum in Iceland, but no vagina equivalent anywhere in the world. She is the Vagina Museum's current Director.  The first ever fundraising event was held at Unit 5 Gallery, London in May 2017. The first pop up exhibition was held in August 2017 at the Edinburgh Fringe Festival. The following year, it toured an exhibition around the UK called "Is Your Vagina Normal?". The Vagina Museum opened its first semi-permanent location in Camden Market with the inaugural exhibition "Muff Busters: Vagina Myths And How To Fight Them" opening on 16th November 2019. To open the museum, a fundraising campaign was held which raised almost £50,000. In 2021, the Vagina Museum closed its doors in Camden Market after the landlords refused to renew the lease in their unit. The Vagina Museum reopened in its second location in March 2022 in ENTER, a venue located in Bethnal Green. The museum is dedicated to being trans-inclusive.

Schechter has spoken at events and lectured around the UK about her work with the Vagina Museum, including the Royal Institution, British Science Festival, Conway Hall, and National Student Pride.

Writing 
On 11 October 2022, it was announced that Penguin would be publishing Schechter's debut book V: An Empowering Celebration of the Vulva and Vagina. The book will be published in March 2023. The book is suitable for ages 14+.

Comedy 
Schechter has been performing comedy since 2016, mostly based around science and biology. She performed her debut hour "Queer By Nature" at Vaults Festival in 2019, all about same sex sexual behaviour in animals.

Honours and awards 
Schechter came highly commended in the Women of the Future Awards in 2017. In 2019, she won Pioneer of the Year in the Sexual Freedom Awards. In 2020, she was nominated for the Rising Star of the Year Award with DIVA Magazine.

Personal life 
Schechter identifies as bisexual.

References

External links 
 Official website
 Vagina Museum website
 Florence Schechter on Twitter

Year of birth missing (living people)
Living people